Golmaal is an upcoming Tamil comedy film written and directed by Pon Kumaran. The film features Jiiva, Shiva, Tanya Hope, and Payal Rajput in lead roles.  The film also features an ensemble supporting cast which includes Yogi Babu, Aadukalam Naren, Manobala, Subbu Panchu, Ramesh Khanna, Yugi Sethu, and Kannada actor Sadhu Kokila.  Produced by B. Vinod Jain, the film was shot in Mauritius under Jaguar studios. The music of the film is composed by Aruldev. The film will be releasing in September 2022.

Plot 
Golmaal revolves around two playboys (Jiiva and Shiva) who use "cheat for a living" as their life mantra.

Cast 

 Jiiva as Millionaire Mani
 Shiva as Billionaire Babu
 Tanya Hope as Shivani
 Payal Rajput 
 Yogi Babu
 Aadukalam Naren
 Manobala
 Subbu Panchu
 Ramesh Khanna
 Yugi Sethu
 Sadhu Kokila
 Vaiyapuri
 Malavika as Mangamma
 Sanjana Singh
 Siddharth Vipin
 K. S. G. Venkatesh
 George Maryan
 Madhua Sneha

References 

Indian comedy films
Upcoming Tamil-language films